The Party's Over is a black-and-white British film directed by Guy Hamilton and starring Oliver Reed. Filmed in 1963, it was censored in the UK over scenes of implied necrophilia, which delayed its release until 1965. It was produced by Anthony Perry, with music by John Barry. Guy Hamilton asked for his name to be removed from the credits in protest at the censorship of the film.

Synopsis
A troubled young American woman, Melina, visits London and encounters a group of beatniks in Chelsea who live lives very different from her own. One of the beatnik group, the devil-may-care Moise (pronounced like Louise), is determined to seduce her, but she resists. The group believe in free love and spend their time smoking and listening to jazz in windowless rooms.

Uncertain what she wants in life, she has been avoiding transatlantic phone calls from her fiancé, Carson, who is eventually sent to London by her wealthy father to bring her back for her wedding.

The beatniks use diversionary tactics to misdirect Carson, and Melina continues to evade him, although he comes close to finding her several times.

The beatniks hang around in an old theatre. One (Phil) gets depressed and goes to the rooftop. The group variously taunt him or shout at him from the ground and he falls forward to his death. His suicide is blamed on failing his university exams but the group know differently. The suicide is then explained: Milena has passed out at a party and the crowd decide to bury her as a joke. They dig a grave on a building site, but when they go back for "the body" Milena has disappeared (but Phil is still there).

Meanwhile one of the female beatniks, Nina is spending a lot of time with Carson and he falls in love with her.

Milena's father arrives to help Carson search, but it appears that Milena really is dead at the point where they sign for "the clothes of the deceased" at a morgue. Nina admits she has known this all along.

When Carson finally  confronts Moise it is revealed that Milena truly was dead, having fallen off the balcony, but the party-goers simply presume she has passed out. Only Phil (who kisses her o the ground) realises she is dead. The mock funeral is therefore accidentally real.

It eventually appears that Moise loved Milena, and Carson loves Nina more than Milena.

At the end, a coffin (presumably holding Milena) is placed on a train to Southampton by Carson and her father. Moise appears and threatens Carson that he will tell her father the truth. Ultimately all he says is "I'm sorry".

There is no explanation as to why the cause of death was not established at the morgue.

Carson leaves arm in arm with Nina.

Cast

 Oliver Reed as Moise
 Clifford David as Carson
 Ann Lynn as Libby
 Katherine Woodville as Nina
 Louise Sorel as Melina
 Mike Pratt as Geronimo the drummer
 Maurice Browning as Tutzi
 Jonathan Burn as Phillip
 Roddy Maude-Roxby as Hector
 Annette Robertson as Fran
 Alison Seebohm as Ada
 Barbara Lott as Almoner
 Eddie Albert as Milena's father, Ben

Censorship
The film was submitted to the British Board of Film Classification (BBFC) in March 1963. John Trevelyan, the Secretary of the Board of the BBFC, called the film "unpleasant, tasteless and rather offensive". The BBFC requested three rounds of cuts, before granting an X certificate and allowing the film to finally reach cinemas in the UK in 1965. Two big changes were incorporated: a voice-over by Oliver Reed and a happier ending focusing on Nina and Carson.

Director Guy Hamilton, the producer, and the executive producer all had their names removed from the credits in protest.

DVD & Blu-ray Release
The Party's Over was released on Dual Format Edition in the UK as part of the BFI's Flipside series.

References

External links 
 
 

1965 films
1965 drama films
British black-and-white films
British drama films
Film censorship in the United Kingdom
Film controversies in the United Kingdom
Films scored by John Barry (composer)
Films directed by Guy Hamilton
Films set in London
Films shot at Pinewood Studios
Necrophilia in film
1960s English-language films
1960s British films